Karma Police (usually capitalised as KARMA POLICE) is the code name for an Internet mass surveillance and data collection programme operated by the United Kingdom's Government Communications Headquarters (GCHQ).

In 2015, documents obtained by The Intercept from U.S. National Security Agency whistleblower Edward Snowden revealed that GCHQ had carried out the KARMA POLICE operation since about 2008. The KARMA POLICE operation swept up the IP address of Internet users visiting websites. The program was established with no public scrutiny or oversight. KARMA POLICE is a powerful spying tool in conjunction with other GCHQ programs, because IP addresses could be cross-referenced with other data. The goal of the program, according to the documents, was "either (a) a web browsing profile for every visible user on the internet, or (b) a user profile for every visible website on the internet."

Karma Police was apparently named after the Radiohead song "Karma Police", which includes the lyric "This is what you’ll get when you mess with us".

See also
 Tempora – another programme revealed by Snowden
 Joint Threat Research Intelligence Group – another GCHQ programme
 Website visitor tracking
 Web browsing history
 Web analytics
 Web mining
 Internet privacy
Mass surveillance in the United Kingdom

References

Privacy of telecommunications
Secret government programs
Mass surveillance
Surveillance scandals
War on terror
GCHQ operations
Internet in the United Kingdom
Intelligence agency programmes revealed by Edward Snowden